Karenleigh A. Overmann  is a cognitive archaeologist known for her work on how ancient societies became numerate and literate. She currently directs the Center for Cognitive Archaeology at the University of Colorado, Colorado Springs, where she also teaches as an Assistant Professor (Adjoint) of Anthropology. Before becoming an academic researcher, Overmann served 25 years of active duty in the U.S. Navy.

Education 
Overmann completed her doctorate in archaeology in 2016 at the University of Oxford as a Clarendon Scholar under the supervision of Lambros Malafouris and Chris Gosden. From 2018 to 2020, Overmann was a Marie Skłodowska-Curie Actions (MSCA) postdoctoral research fellow at the University of Bergen, Norway (project 785793).

Work on numeracy
Overmann has published a number of works showing how numbers are realized and elaborated through the use of material forms; these make the innate sense of number tangible and tractable to manipulation. This work has been highlighted as "a naturalistically plausible account of the emergence of the modern natural number concept."

She analyzed counting artifacts from the Ancient Near East, including fingers, tallies, tokens, and notations. She expanded the catalogue of Near Eastern tokens published by Denise Schmandt-Besserat in 1992 with over 2,300 new entries. The results of analyzing the updated token catalogue were published in 2019 as a component of Overmann's book, The Material Origin of Numbers.

Overmann has also investigated the traditional counting methods used in Oceania, particularly Polynesia; this research solved two mysteries of several centuries' standing: what was meant by the claim that Māori counted by "elevens" and why the Hawaiian word for twenty, iwakalua, meant "nine and two"; both are related to the method of counting by sorting used in Polynesia. She coined the term "ephemeral abacus" to refer to temporary material forms with inherent place value (exponential structure), including collaborative finger-counting and counting by sorting. In 2021, she published a detailed comparison of Polynesian and Mesopotamian numbers, both of which use object-specified counting sequences; the more recent counting practices of Polynesia provide a new way to understand how such counting would have worked in ancient times.

Work on early writing systems and literacy
Overmann has analyzed early writing in Mesopotamia, showing how script and literacy emerged from the practice of handwriting small pictures over the course of about 15 centuries of time. Often working in conjunction with archaeologist Thomas G. Wynn, she has applied insights gained from her analyses of the way writing changes over time to stone tools in the Lower Paleolithic.

Other work
With her colleagues Thomas Wynn and Frederick L. Coolidge, Overmann has written about the cognitive differences between Neandertals and contemporary Homo sapiens and the implications for Neandertal extinction. She has also analyzed Jane Austen's novel Emma as a gender-reversed version of Pride and Prejudice and written about conceptions of the mind and madness in the Regency era.

Selected works

Authored books

Edited volumes

Special journal issues

Articles

Book chapters

See also
 Cognitive archaeology
 Neuroarchaeology
 History of ancient numeral systems
 Undecimal
 René Lesson and Māori counting by elevens
 Binary counting in Mangareva
 Gender reversal in Emma

References

External links
University of Colorado, Colorado Springs Center for Cognitive Archaeology

Living people
American women archaeologists
Alumni of the University of Oxford
Women cognitive scientists
Year of birth missing (living people)
University of Colorado Colorado Springs faculty
21st-century American women